The International Regulations for Preventing Collisions at Sea 1972 (COLREGs) are published by the International Maritime Organization (IMO) and set out, among other things, the "rules of the road" or navigation rules to be followed by ships and other vessels at sea to prevent collisions between two or more vessels. COLREGs can also refer to the specific political line that divides inland waterways, which are subject to their own navigation rules, and coastal waterways which are subject to international navigation rules. The COLREGs are derived from a multilateral treaty called the Convention on the International Regulations for Preventing Collisions at Sea.

Although rules for navigating vessels inland may differ, the international rules specify that they should be as closely in line with the international rules as possible. In most of continental Europe, the Code Européen des Voies de la Navigation Intérieure (CEVNI, or the European Code for Navigation on Inland Waters) apply. In the United States, the rules for vessels navigating inland are published alongside the international rules.

The Racing Rules of Sailing, which govern the conduct of yacht and dinghy racing under the sanction of national sailing authorities which are members of World Sailing, are based on the COLREGs, but differ in some important matters such as overtaking and right of way close to turning marks in competitive sailing.

Organization of the regulatory documents 
As of 2022, there are 41 Rules and four annexes in COLREGs Rules in force.

PART A - GENERAL

Rule 1 - Application

Rule 2 – Responsibility

Rule 3 – General Definitions

PART B - Section I Conduct of Vessels in any Condition of Visibility

Rule 4 – Application

Rule 5 – Look-out

Rule 6 – Safe Speed

Rule 7 – Risk of Collision

Rule 8 – Action to Avoid Collision

Rule 9 – Narrow Channels

Rule 10 – Traffic Separation Schemes

PART B - Section II Conduct of Vessels in Sight of One Another

Rule 11 - Application

Rule 12 – Sailing Vessels

Rule 13 – Overtaking

Rule 14 – Head-on Situation

Rule 15 – Crossing Situation

Rule 16 – Action by Give-way Vessel

Rule 17 – Action by Stand-on Vessel

Rule 18 – Responsibilities Between Vessels

PART B - Section III Conduct of Vessels in Restricted Visibility

Rule 19 – Conduct of Vessels in Restricted Visibility

PART C - Lights and Shapes

Rule 20 – Application

Rule 21 – Definitions

Rule 22 – Visibility of Lights

Rule 23 – Power-driven Vessels Underway

Rule 24 – Towing and Pushing

Rule 25 – Sailing Vessels Underway and Vessels Under Oars

Rule 26 – Fishing Vessels

Rule 27 – Vessels Not Under Command or Restricted in their Ability to Manoeuvre

Rule 28 – Vessels Constrained by their Draught

Rule 29 – Pilot Vessels

Rule 30 – Anchored Vessels and Vessels Aground

Rule 31 – Seaplanes

PART D - Sound and Light Signals

Rule 32 – Definitions

Rule 33 – Equipment for Sound Signals

Rule 34 – Manoeuvring and Warning Signals

Rule 35 - Sound Signals in Restricted Visibility

Rule 36 - Signals to Attract Attention

Rule 37 - Distress Signals

PART E - Exemptions

Rule 38 - Exemptions

PART F - Verification of Compliance with the Provisions of the Convention

Rule 39 - Definitions

Rule 40 - Application

Rule 41 - Verification of Compliance

ANNEX I - Positioning and Technical Details of Lights and Shapes

ANNEX II Addition Signals for Fishing Vessels Fishing in Close Proximity

ANNEX III : Technical Details of Sound Signal Appliances

ANNEX IV Distress Signals

History
Prior to the development of a single set of international rules and practices, there existed separate practices and various conventions and informal procedures in different parts of the world, as advanced by various maritime nations. As a result, there were inconsistencies and even contradictions that gave rise to unintended collisions. Vessel navigation lights for operating in darkness as well as navigation marks also were not standardised, giving rise to dangerous confusion and ambiguity between vessels at risk of colliding.

With the advent of steam-powered ships in the mid-19th century, conventions for sailing vessel navigation had to be supplemented with conventions for power-driven vessel navigation. Sailing vessels are limited as to their manoeuvrability in that they cannot sail directly into the wind and cannot be readily navigated in the absence of wind. On the other hand, steamships can manoeuvre in all 360 degrees of direction and can be manoeuvred irrespective of the presence or absence of wind.

In 1840 in London, Trinity House drew up a set of regulations which were enacted by Parliament in 1846. The Trinity House rules were included in the Steam Navigation Act 1846, and the Admiralty regulations regarding lights for steam ships were included in this statute in 1848. In 1849 Congress extended the light requirements to sailing vessels on US waters. In the UK in 1858 coloured sidelights were recommended for sailing vessels and fog signals were required to be given, by steam vessels on the ship's whistle and by sailing vessels on the fog horn or bell, while a separate but similar action was also taken in the United States.

In 1850, English maritime law was being adopted in the United States.

Also in 1850, courts in the England and the United States adopted common law pertaining to reasonable speed within the Assured Clear Distance Ahead.

In 1863 a new set of rules drawn up by the British Board of Trade, in consultation with the French government, came into force. By 1864 the regulations (or Articles) had been adopted by more than thirty maritime countries, including Germany and the United States (passed by the United States Congress as Rules to prevent Collisions at Sea. An act fixing certain rules and regulations for preventing collisions on the water. 29 April 1864, ch. 69. and signed into law by President Abraham Lincoln).

In 1867, Thomas Gray, assistant secretary to the Maritime Department of the Board of Trade, wrote The Rule of the Road, a pamphlet that became famous for its well-known mnemonic verses.

In 1878, the United States codified its common law rules for reducing the risk of collisions.

In 1880, the 1863 Articles were supplemented with whistle signals and in 1884 a new set of international regulations was implemented.

In 1889 the United States convened the first international maritime conference in Washington, D.C. The resulting rules were adopted in 1890 and effected in 1897. Some minor changes were made during the 1910 Brussels Maritime Conference and some rule changes were proposed, but never ratified, at the 1929 International Conference on Safety of Life at Sea (S.O.L.A.S.) With the recommendation that the direction of a turn be referenced by the rudder instead of the helm or tiller being informally agreed by all maritime nations in 1935.

The 1948 S.O.L.A.S. International Conference made several recommendations, including the recognition of radar these were eventually ratified in 1952 and became effective in 1954. Further recommendations were made by a S.O.L.A.S. Conference in London in 1960 which became effective in 1965.

The International Regulations for Preventing Collisions at Sea were adopted as a convention of the International Maritime Organization on 20 October 1972 and entered into force on 15 July 1977. They were designed to update and replace the Collision Regulations of 1960, particularly with regard to Traffic Separation Schemes (TSS) following the first of these, introduced in the Strait of Dover in 1967. As of June 2013, the convention has been ratified by 155 states representing 98.7% of the tonnage of the world's merchant fleets.

The international regulations have been amended several times since their first adoption. In 1981 Rule 10 was amended with regard to dredging or surveying in traffic separation schemes. In 1987 amendments were made to several rules, including rule 1(e) for vessels of special construction; rule 3(h), vessels constrained by her draught and Rule 10(c), crossing traffic lanes. In 1989 Rule 10 was altered to stop unnecessary use of the inshore traffic zones associated with TSS. In 1993 amendments were made concerning the positioning of lights on vessels. In 2001 new rules were added relating to wing-in-ground-effect (WIG) craft and in 2007 the text of Annex IV (Distress signals) was rewritten.

The 2013 amendments (resolution A.1085(28))
Adoption: 4 December 2013
Entry into force: 1 January 2016
After existing part E (Exemptions), a new part F (Verification of compliance with the provisions of the Convention) is added in order for the Organization to make necessary verifications under the IMO Member State Audit Scheme.

Jurisdictions

The International Maritime Organization (IMO) convention, including the almost four dozen "rules" contained in the international regulations, must be adopted by each member country that is signatory to the convention—COLREG laws must exist within each jurisdiction. Thereafter, each IMO member country must designate an "administration"—national authority or agency—for implementing the provisions of the COLREG convention, as it applies to vessels over which the national authority has jurisdiction. Individual governing bodies must pass legislation to establish or assign such authority, as well as to create national navigation laws (and subsequent specific regulations) which conform to the international convention; each national administration is thereafter responsible for the implementation and enforcement of the regulations as it applies to ships and vessels under its legal authority. As well, administrations are typically empowered to enact modifications that apply to vessels in waters under the national jurisdiction concerned, provided that any such modifications are not inconsistent with the COLREGs.

Canada
The Canadian version of the COLREGs is provided by Transport Canada, which regulates Canadian vessels.

United Kingdom
The UK version of the COLREGs is provided by the Maritime and Coastguard Agency (MCA), in the Merchant Shipping (Distress Signals and Prevention of Collisions) Regulations of 1996. They are distributed and accessed in the form of a "Merchant Shipping Notice" (MSN), which is used to convey mandatory information that must be complied with under UK legislation. These MSNs relate to Statutory Instruments and contain the technical detail of such regulations. Material published by the MCA is subject to Crown copyright protection, but the MCA allows it to be reproduced free of charge in any format or medium for research or private study, provided it is reproduced accurately and not used in a misleading context.

United States
The US version of the COLREGs is provided by the United States Coast Guard of the US Department of Homeland Security.

No right-of-way
A commonly held misconception concerning the rules of marine navigation is that by following specific rules, a vessel can gain certain rights of way over other vessels. No vessel ever has "right of way" over other vessels. Rather, there can be a "give way" vessel and a "stand on" vessel, or there may be two give way vessels with no stand on vessel. A stand on vessel does not have any right of way over any give way vessel, and is not free to maneuver however it wishes, but is obliged to keep a constant course and speed (so as to help the give way vessel in determining a safe course). So standing on is an obligation, not a right, and is not a privilege.  Furthermore, a stand on vessel may still be obliged (under Rule 2 and Rule 17) to give way itself, in particular when a situation has arisen where a collision can no longer be avoided by actions of the give way vessel alone. For example, two power-driven vessels approaching each other head-to-head, are both deemed to be "give way" and both are required to alter course so as to avoid colliding with the other. Neither vessel has "right of way".

See also

 Assured Clear Distance Ahead
 Brussels Collision Convention
 Navigation
 Navigational aid
 Pilotage
 Sea mark

References

Further reading
 

   RN approved self-study book.  Includes the full text of the colregs.

External links
 International Regulations for Preventing Collisions at Sea. Wikisource. Retrieved 18 July 2010

1972 in London
Navigational aids
Admiralty law treaties
International Maritime Organization treaties
International transport
Naval architecture
Traffic law
Treaties concluded in 1972
Treaties entered into force in 1977
Treaties extended to American Samoa
Treaties extended to Aruba
Treaties extended to Baker Island
Treaties extended to Bermuda
Treaties extended to British Honduras
Treaties extended to British Hong Kong
Treaties extended to the British Solomon Islands
Treaties extended to the British Virgin Islands
Treaties extended to the Cayman Islands
Treaties extended to the Falkland Islands
Treaties extended to Gibraltar
Treaties extended to the Gilbert and Ellice Islands
Treaties extended to Guam
Treaties extended to Guernsey
Treaties extended to Howland Island
Treaties extended to the Isle of Man
Treaties extended to Jarvis Island
Treaties extended to Jersey
Treaties extended to Johnston Atoll
Treaties extended to Midway Atoll
Treaties extended to Montserrat
Treaties extended to Navassa Island
Treaties extended to the Netherlands Antilles
Treaties extended to Palmyra Atoll
Treaties extended to the Pitcairn Islands
Treaties extended to Saint Helena, Ascension and Tristan da Cunha
Treaties extended to the Turks and Caicos Islands
Treaties extended to the Panama Canal Zone
Treaties extended to Puerto Rico
Treaties extended to Portuguese Macau
Treaties extended to the Trust Territory of the Pacific Islands
Treaties extended to the United States Virgin Islands
Treaties extended to Wake Island
Treaties of Albania
Treaties of Algeria
Treaties of the People's Republic of Angola
Treaties of Antigua and Barbuda
Treaties of Argentina
Treaties of Australia
Treaties of Austria
Treaties of Azerbaijan
Treaties of the Bahamas
Treaties of Bahrain
Treaties of Bangladesh
Treaties of Barbados
Treaties of Belarus
Treaties of Belgium
Treaties of Belize
Treaties of the People's Republic of Benin
Treaties of Bolivia
Treaties of the military dictatorship in Brazil
Treaties of Brunei
Treaties of the People's Republic of Bulgaria
Treaties of Cambodia
Treaties of Cameroon
Treaties of Canada
Treaties of Cape Verde
Treaties of Chile
Treaties of the People's Republic of China
Treaties of Colombia
Treaties of the Comoros
Treaties of the Republic of the Congo
Treaties of the Cook Islands
Treaties of Ivory Coast
Treaties of Croatia
Treaties of Cuba
Treaties of Cyprus
Treaties of the Czech Republic
Treaties of Czechoslovakia
Treaties of Denmark
Treaties of the Derg
Treaties of Djibouti
Treaties of Dominica
Treaties of the Dominican Republic
Treaties of Ecuador
Treaties of Egypt
Treaties of El Salvador
Treaties of Equatorial Guinea
Treaties of Eritrea
Treaties of Estonia
Treaties of Fiji
Treaties of Finland
Treaties of France
Treaties of Gabon
Treaties of the Gambia
Treaties of Georgia (country)
Treaties of East Germany
Treaties of West Germany
Treaties of Ghana
Treaties of Greece
Treaties of Grenada
Treaties of Guatemala
Treaties of Guinea
Treaties of Guyana
Treaties of Honduras
Treaties of the Hungarian People's Republic
Treaties of Iceland
Treaties of India
Treaties of Indonesia
Treaties of Iran
Treaties of Ireland
Treaties of Israel
Treaties of Italy
Treaties of Jamaica
Treaties of Japan
Treaties of Jordan
Treaties of Kazakhstan
Treaties of Kenya
Treaties of Kiribati
Treaties of North Korea
Treaties of South Korea
Treaties of Kuwait
Treaties of Latvia
Treaties of Lebanon
Treaties of Liberia
Treaties of the Libyan Arab Jamahiriya
Treaties of Lithuania
Treaties of Luxembourg
Treaties of Malaysia
Treaties of the Maldives
Treaties of Malta
Treaties of the Marshall Islands
Treaties of Mauritania
Treaties of Mauritius
Treaties of Mexico
Treaties of Moldova
Treaties of Monaco
Treaties of Mongolia
Treaties of Montenegro
Treaties of Morocco
Treaties of Mozambique
Treaties of Myanmar
Treaties of Namibia
Treaties of the Netherlands
Treaties of New Zealand
Treaties of Nicaragua
Treaties of Nigeria
Treaties of Niue
Treaties of Norway
Treaties of Oman
Treaties of Palau
Treaties of Pakistan
Treaties of Panama
Treaties of Papua New Guinea
Treaties of Peru
Treaties of the Philippines
Treaties of the Polish People's Republic
Treaties of Portugal
Treaties of Qatar
Treaties of the Socialist Republic of Romania
Treaties of the Soviet Union
Treaties of Saint Kitts and Nevis
Treaties of Saint Lucia
Treaties of Saint Vincent and the Grenadines
Treaties of Samoa
Treaties of São Tomé and Príncipe
Treaties of Saudi Arabia
Treaties of Senegal
Treaties of Serbia and Montenegro
Treaties of Seychelles
Treaties of Sierra Leone
Treaties of Singapore
Treaties of Slovakia
Treaties of Slovenia
Treaties of the Solomon Islands
Treaties of South Africa
Treaties of Spain
Treaties of Sri Lanka
Treaties of the Republic of the Sudan (1985–2011)
Treaties of Sweden
Treaties of Switzerland
Treaties of Syria
Treaties of Tanzania
Treaties of Thailand
Treaties of Togo
Treaties of Tonga
Treaties of Trinidad and Tobago
Treaties of Tunisia
Treaties of Turkey
Treaties of Turkmenistan
Treaties of Tuvalu
Treaties of Ukraine
Treaties of the United Arab Emirates
Treaties of the United Kingdom
Treaties of the United States
Treaties of Uruguay
Treaties of Vanuatu
Treaties of Venezuela
Treaties of Vietnam
Treaties of South Yemen
Treaties of Yugoslavia
Treaties of Zaire